Gypsy Happiness is a 1981 Soviet drama film directed by Sergey Nikonenko.

Plot 
The film tells about a gypsy woman named Maria, who has a son, Sashka, with whom she settles in the village. There Sasha finds friends and love.

Cast 
 Nikolay Kryuchkov
 Ivan Kamensky
 Marina Yakovleva
 Ekaterina Voronina
 Georgiy Svetlani
 Sergey Nikonenko		
 Ekaterina Zhemchuzhnaya
 Lidiya Fedoseeva-Shukshina	
 Andrey Smolyakov
 Lev Borisov

References

External links 
 

1981 films
1980s Russian-language films
Soviet drama films
1981 drama films